Invisible Cities is the fourth studio album by ambient music duo A Winged Victory for the Sullen. It was released on 26 February 2021 by Artificial Pinearch in association with Ninja Tune. The album was composed as the score of a 90-minute multimedia theatre production that was inspired by Italo Calvino's 1972 novel of the same name. The record relies prominently on an instrumental production featuring piano chords, arpeggiated strings, and distortion. Music critics were generally favourable towards the album, with particular praise towards its instrumental soundscape.

Background and release 
Invisible Cities follows the duo's 2019 studio album The Undivided Five. The duo, composed of Adam Wiltzie and Dustin O'Halloran, have previously composed scores for numerous films and televisions, and so they were commissioned to compose the score for a 90-minute multimedia stage production directed by video designer Leo Warner. The album was essentially conceived as the score of the dance theatre production.

The production's stage was inspired by Italian writer Italo Calvino's post-modern novel Invisible Cities (1972), which was written as a string of conversations between Kublai Khan and Marco Polo. It premiered at the Manchester International Festival in July 2019. It was slated for a worldwide tour to follow, but the COVID-19 pandemic struck and all plans for tour events post-lockdown were scrapped, with the production practically shut down. Wiltzie explained in an interview:  

The release of the album Invisible Cities was announced in December 2020, alongside the release of the album's cover art and tracklist. The track "Desires are Already Memories" was also delivered as the lead single from the album. The album was finally released on 26 February 2021 by Artificial Pinearch in partnership with Ninja Tune.

Critical reception 

At Metacritic, which assigns a weighted average rating out of 100 to reviews from mainstream publications, the album received an average score of 80, based on nine reviews, indicating "generally favourable reviews". At AnyDecentMusic?, which collates album reviews from websites, magazines and newspapers, the album was given a 7.5 score out of 10, based on a critical consensus of seven reviews.

In The Line of Best Fit, Ray Honeybourne described the album as a "recognisable wide-angle instrumental soundscape" that incorporated "some intelligently-arranged vocal elements at key points, serving well to convey contrast and dramatic effects arising out of Marco Polo's verbal images." He further wrote that the record was a testament to the duo's "growing musical ambition and inventiveness." Pitchforks Brian Howe believed that the album established the neoclassical-ambient template of the duo, being accompanied by "wide, spreading basses on the bottom, distorted melodies sharply etching the high end, and soft harmonies shifting in the abyssal middle." Nick Roseblade of Clash called the album "beguiling" and is "as rich as its subject matter". He further found the tracks "architecturally sound" that made the album "a musical flaneur." 

Paul Simpson of AllMusic lauded the experimental music and instrumental production, and felt the record stood out "even without the choreography and high-res video projections". musicOMHs Steven Johnson wrote that the album retained the duo's "defining stylistic principles". He opined that although the compositional pieces  were not "as diaphanous or as overtly sad as some of their previous work", they "are still sources of shimmering and slow-moving beauty." PopMatters writer Chris Ingalls praised the album as an "inspiring" and "invigorating" experience but felt that it lacked the "frenetic pace" needed to accompany such a collection of compositions.

Track listing 
All tracks were written and composed by  Adam Wiltzie and Dustin O'Halloran.

References 

2021 albums
A Winged Victory for the Sullen albums
Ninja Tune albums
Adaptations of works by Italo Calvino